Major-General Simon Joseph Fraser, 14th Lord Lovat and 3rd Baron Lovat,  (25 November 1871 – 18 February 1933), was a leading Roman Catholic aristocrat, landowner, forester, soldier, politician and the 23rd Chief of Clan Fraser. While legally the 14th Lord Lovat (and 3rd Baron Lovat), he was referred to as the 16th Lord, due to two previous Lord Lovats forfeiting the title.

Early life
Born on 25 November 1871, he was the eldest surviving son of nine children born to Simon Fraser, 13th Lord Lovat, and Alice Maria Weld-Blundell. Among his siblings were Mary Laura Fraser (wife of John Scott, Viscount Encombe and mother of John Scott, 4th Earl of Eldon), Alice Mary Charlotte Fraser (wife of Bernard Constable-Maxwell and mother of Gerald Maxwell), Etheldreada Mary Fraser (wife of diplomat Sir Francis Oswald Lindley), Hugh Joseph Fraser, a Major with the Scots Guards who was killed in the First Battle of Ypres during World War I), Alastair Thomas Joseph Fraser (husband of Lady Sibyl Grimston, daughter of James Grimston, 3rd Earl of Verulam), Margaret Mary Fraser (wife of Brig.-Gen. Archibald Stirling and mother of Sir David Stirling) and Muriel Mary Rose Fraser, who became a Catholic nun. His father served as Lord Lieutenant of Inverness and aide-de-camp to Queen Victoria from 1883 to 1887.

Educated at Fort Augustus Abbey and Magdalen College, Oxford, he was an active member of the Oxford University polo team and left with an MA.

Career
Lord Lovat was commissioned into the Queen's Own Cameron Highlanders and promoted lieutenant in 1890, but transferred as a Lieutenant into the 1st Life Guards in 1894. In 1897, he resigned from the Regular Army and joined a volunteer battalion of the Queen's Own Cameron Highlanders.

Boer War and Lovat Scouts
In late 1899, he raised the Lovat Scouts for service in the Second Boer War in South Africa, and from February 1900 served as their second-in-command with the rank of captain, in charge of the mounted infantry. For the Lovat Scouts, he chose the best marksmen he could find and the perfect commander in Andrew David Murray. The corps arrived in South Africa in early 1900, and was attached to the Black Watch, but were disbanded in July 1901 while two companies (the 113th and 114th) were formed for the Imperial Yeomanry. Lord Lovat continued as second-in-command of the two companies until Col. Murray was killed in a night action with a Boer Commando on 19/20 September 1901, after which he took command of the regiment himself (now aged 29), and remained in command until the end of the war.

The war ended in June 1902, and Lord Lovat relinquished his commission with the Imperial Yeomanry and was granted the honorary rank of major in the Army on 11 July 1902. He returned to the United Kingdom with the corps on the SS Tintagel Castle the following month, arriving to a public welcome in Inverness in late August. For his service in the war, he was mentioned in despatches (including the final despatch by Lord Kitchener dated 23 June 1902), was awarded the Distinguished Service Order (DSO) in 1900, and appointed a Companion of the Order of the Bath (CB) in October 1902.

After the end of the Second Boer War, the remaining two companies (which had been attached to the Imperial Yeomanry for the latter part of the war) returned to the United Kingdom and were disbanded. The unit was reformed the following year, consisting of two regiments, titled the 1st and 2nd Lovat Scouts. From these scouts a sharpshooter unit was formed and formally become the British Army's first sniper unit.

Lord Lovat was appointed a Commander of the Royal Victorian Order (CVO) in 1903 by King Edward VII. He later served as aide-de-camp to King George V.

First World War

In World War I, he commanded the Highland Mounted Brigade of the 2nd Mounted Division, being promoted Brigadier-General in September 1914.  He was appointed a Knight of the Thistle in 1915 for demonstrable leadership and courage.

In March 1916, he took command of the 4th Mounted Division and became a Major General two months later. He became a Rhodes Trustee in 1917, the same year as Rudyard Kipling.

In 1919, Lovat was awarded Knight Commander of the Order of St Michael and St George and was appointed Chairman of the Army Forestry Commission, serving from 1919 to 1927.

Political career
Apart from a military career Lovat was also Chairman of the Forestry Commission from 1919 to 1927 and served in the Conservative administration of Stanley Baldwin as Under-Secretary of State for Dominion Affairs from 1927 to 1929.

Personal life

In February 1910, Lord Lovat was rumoured to be engaged to American heiress, Edith Clark, a daughter of Charles S. Clark of New York and Grosvenor Square, London. However, on 15 October 1910, Lovat married Hon. Laura Lister (1892–1965), the second daughter of Thomas Lister, 4th Baron Ribblesdale and, his first wife, Charlotte Monkton Tennant (a daughter of Sir Charles Tennant, 1st Baronet, MP for Peebles and Selkirk). Among the Fraser family estates was Beaufort Castle in Scotland (rebuilt by his father in the late 1870s) and 181,800 acres of land. Together, they were the parents of five children, four of whom lived to maturity:
 
 Simon Christopher Joseph Fraser, 15th Lord Lovat (1911–1995), who married Rosamond Delves Broughton, the only daughter of Sir Henry Broughton, 11th Baronet, in 1938.
 Magdalen Mary Charlotte Fraser (1913–1969), who married her cousin John Scott, 4th Earl of Eldon, a Royal Auxiliary Air Force officer and was the mother of John Scott, 5th Earl of Eldon.
 Sir Hugh Charles Patrick Joseph Fraser (1918–1984), an MP for Stafford and Stone, Under-Secretary of State for the Colonies, and Secretary of State for Air who married author Lady Antonia Margaret Caroline Pakenham, a daughter of Frank Pakenham, 7th Earl of Longford and Elizabeth Pakenham, Countess of Longford, in 1956. They divorced in 1977. 
 Veronica Nell Fraser (1920–2005), a food writer and hotelier who married Lt. Alan Phipps of the Royal Navy in 1940. After his death in 1944, she married Sir Fitzroy Maclean, 1st Baronet in 1946.
 Mary Diana Rose Fraser (1926–1940), who died at age 14.

Lovat died of a heart attack in London in February 1933, aged 61, and was succeeded by his eldest son Simon as the [[Simon Fraser, 15th Lord Lovat|15th Lord Lovat']] (known as the 17th Lord), who distinguished himself during the D-Day landings at Normandy in June 1944.

Descendants
Through his eldest son Simon, he was a grandfather of six, including Simon Fraser, Master of Lovat (1939–1994), Fiona Mary Fraser (b. 1941) (wife of Robin Richard Allen), Annabel Thérèse "Tessa" Fraser (b. 1942) (wife of Hugh Mackay, 14th Lord Reay and Sir Henry Keswick), Kim Ian Maurice Fraser (1946–2020), Hugh Alastair Joseph Fraser (1947–2011) (husband of Drusilla Jane Montgomerie), Andrew Roy Matthew Fraser (1952–1994) (husband of Lady Charlotte Anne Greville, a daughter of David Greville, 8th Earl of Warwick).

Through his daughter Magdalen, he was a grandfather of three, including John Joseph Nicholas Scott, 5th Earl of Eldon (1937–2017) and Simon Peter Scott (b. 1939).

Through his son Sir Hugh, he was a grandfather of six, including Rebecca Rose Fraser (b. 1957), Flora Fraser (b. 1958), Benjamin Hugh Fraser (b. 1961), Natasha Fraser (b. 1963), Damian Fraser (b. 1964), and Orlando Fraser (b. 1967).

References

 Bibliography Dictionary of National Biography''

External links

ThePeerage.com

\

1871 births
1933 deaths
Barons in the Peerage of the United Kingdom
Knights of the Thistle
Clan Fraser
British foresters
Scottish Roman Catholics
British Life Guards officers
Queen's Own Cameron Highlanders officers
British Army cavalry generals of World War I
British Army personnel of the Second Boer War
Companions of the Distinguished Service Order
Companions of the Order of the Bath
Lovat Scouts officers
Knights Commander of the Order of St Michael and St George
Knights Grand Cross of the Royal Victorian Order
People educated at Ampleforth College
Fraser, Simon Fraser, 6th Lord
Lords Lovat